The Sonata in A major for transverse flute and harpsichord by Johann Sebastian Bach (BWV 1032) is a sonata in 3 movements:

 Movement 1: Vivace (in A major)
 Movement 2: Largo e dolce (in A minor, ending with an imperfect cadence)
 Movement 3: Allegro (in A major)

Unusually, the second movement is written in the parallel minor (A minor), rather than the relative minor (F-sharp minor) or another closely related key. 

The autograph is incomplete, and there are 46 bars missing. There exist reconstructions by various authors.

See also
 Concerto, BWV 525a (middle movement)

References

Sources

External links 
 Flute Sonata in A major, BWV 1032: performance by the Netherlands Bach Society (video and background information)
 

Flute sonatas by Johann Sebastian Bach
Trio sonatas
Compositions in A major